Gover is both a surname and a given name. Notable people with the name include:

Surname:
Alf Gover (1908–2001), English cricketer
Janet Gover, Australian writer
Michael Gover (born 1918), English actor
Paul Gover (born 1968), English cricketer
Roy Henry Gover (1929–2003), British painter and composer
Robert Gover (1929–2015), American journalist and novelist
Victor M. Gover (1908–1970), British film director

Given name:
Gover Le Buen (1639–1712), fighter in the Franco-Dutch War

See also
Gover Stream, stream in Cornwall, England